The first season of The Voice Kids, a Brazilian televised singing competition, premiered on January 3, 2016, on Rede Globo in the 2:00 / 1:00 p.m. (BRST / AMT) daytime slot.

The coaches were revealed in October 2015 to be: Brazilian axé singer Ivete Sangalo, MPB singer-songwriter Carlinhos Brown, and sertanejo duo Victor & Leo. Tiago Leifert  is a host of the show and Kika Martinez served as backstage interviewer.

Teams
 Key

Blind auditions
Key

Episode 1 (Jan. 3)

Episode 2 (Jan. 10)

Episode 3 (Jan. 17)

Episode 4 (Jan. 24)

Episode 5 (Jan. 31)

Episode 6 (Feb. 7)

The Battles
Key

Live shows

Elimination chart
Artist's info

	

Result details

Week 1

Quarterfinals 1

Week 2

Quarterfinals 2

Week 3

Semifinals

Week 4

Finals

References

Kids 1
2016 Brazilian television seasons